This is a list of yearly Missouri Valley Football Conference champions. Co-champions are listed in alphabetical order.

Champions by year

Source:

Note: The conference was known as the Gateway Football Conference prior from 1992-2008. Then, from 1982-92 the conference was known as the Gateway Collegiate Athletic Conference.

^ Final ranking after the championship game that season
^^ The STATS poll was supplied by The Sports Network prior to 2015
^^^ 2020 season was played in Spring 2021 due to the COVID-19 pandemic

Championships by team

Keys
 Italics indicate a school no longer competing in the MVFC
 Bold indicates an outright conference championship

Championships by head coach

See also
 List of Missouri Valley Football Conference standings

References

 
Lists of college football conference champions